Christopher James Cralle (born 15 June 1988 in College Station, Texas) is a competitive USA hammer thrower, who is regarded as the most accomplished Sam Houston State athlete in Hammer Throw of all time.

High school career
As an athlete Chris came on a scholarship from A&M Consolidated High School to Sam Houston State University. Cralle was the 2006 Texas 5A state champion in the discus but soon found greater success at the collegiate level in the hammer throw.

Collegiate career
Cralle qualified for the NCAA National Championships in track and field as a Sophomore, Junior and fifth year Senior. Chris's top performance came at the USA track and field championships where he placed 8th with a Personal Record of 71.09

2012 Olympic trials
While most of Chris Cralle's friends would consider him a mad man for doing the same thing over and over expecting different results, he proved he was not mad. On June 21, 2012, Chris unleashed a massive personal record of 74.36  meters gaining a second-place finish at the 2012 US Olympic Trials.  Chris is currently training at Sam Houston State University as a coach and athlete and looks forward to the 2016 Olympic Games.

References

1988 births
Living people
American male hammer throwers
People from College Station, Texas
Sam Houston State University alumni